Mihály Tóth may refer to

Mihály Tóth (footballer, born 1926), Hungarian football player during the 1940s and 1950s
Mihály Tóth (footballer, born 1974), Hungarian football player currently with Hungarian team Szolnoki MÁV FC